Henry Denny (1803–1871) was an English museum curator and entomologist.

Henry Denny may refer also to:

Sir Henry Denny, 7th Baronet (1878–1953), of the Denny baronets
Henry Denny (MP), MP for St Germans
Henry Denny (rugby league) in 1933–34 Kangaroo tour of Great Britain

See also
Henry Denny Denson (1715–1780), Irish-born soldier and political figure in Nova Scotia